Inter Trans Air was a cargo airline based in Sofia, Bulgaria. The airline ceased all operations in 2002.

Code data
ICAO Code: ITT

Fleet
The Inter Trans Air fleet consisted of 2 Antonov An-12BP aircraft (at January 2005).

References
Flight International, 5–11 April 2005

Defunct airlines of Bulgaria
Airlines established in 1996
Airlines disestablished in 2005
Bulgarian companies established in 1996
2005 disestablishments in Bulgaria